Wolf Tracks: The Best of Los Lobos is the third compilation album by the American rock band Los Lobos, released in 2006 by Rhino Records. It contains twenty tracks originally released between 1983 and 2002, except for the previously unissued album outtake "Border Town Girl".

Track listing

Personnel 
Credits adapted from the album's liner notes.

Los Lobos
 David Hidalgo – vocals, electric and acoustic guitar, accordion, violin, banjo, 6-string bass, piano, drums, percussion
 Cesar Rosas – vocals, electric and acoustic guitar, mandolin
 Louie Pérez – drums, percussion, guitar, fraustophone, vocals
 Conrad Lozano – electric and acoustic bass, fretless bass, vocals
 Steve Berlin – saxophone, flute, harmonica, melodica, organ, piano, clavinet, synthesizer, percussion
Additional musicians
 T-Bone Burnett – acoustic guitar, organ (3–7), vocals (8–10)
 Alex Acuña – percussion (3–10, 16, 17)
 Mitchell Froom – keyboards (8–10, 16–18)
 Mickey Curry – drums (8–10, 12)
 Anton Fier – drums (8–10)
 Ron Tutt – drums (8–10)
 John Hiatt – vocals (8)
 Jim Keltner – drums, percussion (15, 20)
 Pete Thomas – drums (16–19)
 Victor Bisetti – percussion (16–18)

Production
 T-Bone Burnett – producer (1–10)
 Steve Berlin – producer (1–7, 11), discographical annotation (liner notes)
 Mitchell Froom – producer (12, 16–18)
 Los Lobos – producer (8–10, 14–20), executive producer
 Larry Hirsch – producer (15, 20)
 Tchad Blake – producer (18)
 Keith Keller – engineer (13)
 James Austin – compilation producer, liner notes
 Chris Tetzeli – executive producer
 Bill Inglot – sound producer, remastering
 Dan Hersch – remastering
 Matt Abels – product manager
 Gary Peterson – discographical annotation (liner notes)
 Cory Frye – editorial supervision
 Masaki Koike – art direction
 Robert Sebree – cover photography
 Chris Morris – liner notes

References

Los Lobos albums
2006 greatest hits albums
Rhino Records compilation albums
Albums produced by T Bone Burnett
Albums produced by Mitchell Froom
Albums produced by Tchad Blake